Charles Lamont Shufford, Jr. (born February 3, 1973) is an American former professional boxer. He challenged once for the WBO world heavyweight title in 2001.

Amateur career
Charles Shufford, a nephew of former welterweight contender Horace Shufford, was considered a star of Las Vegas amateur boxing, frequently fighting at Golden Gloves tournaments and Olympic trials. Shufford had 35 (?) amateur fights at super heavyweight (no exact record given), which included fights against Michael Grant (most notably in 1993) and Lance Whitaker, famously beating Whitaker at 1996 Olympic trials, before turning professional in 1996.

Professional career
Shufford made his professional debut at November 11, 1996, defeating Kirk Holyfield by first-round TKO. Within five years, Shufford compiled 17–1 record that included back-to-back wins over Jimmy Thunder by seventh-round TKO and rising star Lamon Brewster via unanimous decision.

These wins lined him up for a shot at the WBO world heavyweight title against Wladimir Klitschko. For the bout Shufford weighed in at 234 lbs., dropping 17 pounds compared to his last bout. Shufford, having played George Foreman opposite Will Smith in the movie Ali, entered the ring with Smith by his side. Shufford was knocked down three times, once in round two, once in round three (both times with a straight right hand) and in round six with a left hook, with referee stopping the bout after the third knockdown. According to punch stats, Klitschko landed 58 of 262 punches (22%) and Shufford connected on 16 of 190 (8%).

After that, Shufford was not able to stay in the heavyweight title scene. He remained inactive for over a year before returning to the ring against Marcellus Brown, winning by unanimous decision. He then beat Elieser Castillo but lost to Lawrence Clay-Bey and Jameel McCline. After losing to a rising star Samuel Peter by one-sided unanimous decision, Shufford was inactive for two years, and fought only sporadically since. He went 0–2–1 in his last three fights with a draw against Kelvin Davis and losses to Malik Scott and Jason Estrada.

Professional boxing record

|-
|align="center" colspan=8|20 Wins (9 knockouts, 11 decisions), 8 Losses (2 knockouts, 6 decisions), 1 Draw 
|-
| align="center" style="border-style: none none solid solid; background: #e3e3e3"|Result
| align="center" style="border-style: none none solid solid; background: #e3e3e3"|Record
| align="center" style="border-style: none none solid solid; background: #e3e3e3"|Opponent
| align="center" style="border-style: none none solid solid; background: #e3e3e3"|Type
| align="center" style="border-style: none none solid solid; background: #e3e3e3"|Round
| align="center" style="border-style: none none solid solid; background: #e3e3e3"|Date
| align="center" style="border-style: none none solid solid; background: #e3e3e3"|Location
| align="center" style="border-style: none none solid solid; background: #e3e3e3"|Notes
|-align=center
|Loss
|
|align=left| Jason Estrada
|UD
|10
|25/01/2008
|align=left| Mashantucket, Connecticut, U.S.
|align=left|
|-
|Loss
|
|align=left| Malik Scott
|UD
|10
|04/05/2007
|align=left| Las Vegas, Nevada, U.S.
|align=left|
|-
|Draw
|
|align=left| Kelvin Davis
|PTS
|6
|07/07/2006
|align=left| Hyannis, Massachusetts, U.S.
|align=left|
|-
|Loss
|
|align=left| Samuel Peter
|UD
|10
|17/05/2004
|align=left| Las Vegas, Nevada, U.S.
|align=left|
|-
|Loss
|
|align=left| Gilbert Martinez
|SD
|10
|25/10/2003
|align=left| Tunica, Mississippi, U.S.
|align=left|
|-
|Win
|
|align=left| Willie Chapman
|MD
|10
|12/07/2003
|align=left| Stateline, Nevada, U.S.
|align=left|
|-
|Loss
|
|align=left| Jameel McCline
|TKO
|3
|09/05/2003
|align=left| Atlantic City, New Jersey, U.S.
|align=left|
|-
|Loss
|
|align=left| Lawrence Clay Bey
|UD
|10
|03/01/2003
|align=left| Norman, Oklahoma, U.S.
|align=left|
|-
|Win
|
|align=left| Elieser Castillo
|UD
|12
|13/10/2002
|align=left| Choctaw, Mississippi, U.S.
|align=left|
|-
|Win
|
|align=left| Marcellus Brown
|UD
|6
|21/09/2002
|align=left| Las Vegas, Nevada, U.S.
|align=left|
|-
|Loss
|
|align=left| Wladimir Klitschko
|TKO
|6
|04/08/2001
|align=left| Las Vegas, Nevada, U.S.
|align=left|
|-
|Win
|
|align=left| Rodney McSwain
|TKO
|5
|17/06/2001
|align=left| West Wendover, Utah, U.S.
|align=left|
|-
|Win
|
|align=left| Lamon Brewster
|UD
|10
|21/10/2000
|align=left| Detroit, Michigan, U.S.
|align=left|
|-
|Win
|
|align=left| Jimmy Thunder
|TKO
|8
|07/09/2000
|align=left| Baltimore, Maryland, U.S.
|align=left|
|-
|Win
|
|align=left| Derrick Banks
|UD
|10
|05/05/2000
|align=left| Las Vegas, Nevada, U.S.
|align=left|
|-
|Loss
|
|align=left| Robert Davis
|UD
|10
|18/02/2000
|align=left| Atlantic City, New Jersey, U.S.
|align=left|
|-
|Win
|
|align=left| Jeff Lally
|TKO
|2
|22/01/2000
|align=left| Las Vegas, Nevada, U.S.
|align=left|
|-
|Win
|
|align=left| Anthony Moore
|UD
|8
|04/11/1999
|align=left| Worley, Idaho, U.S.
|align=left|
|-
|Win
|
|align=left| Bruce Bellocchi
|TKO
|4
|17/06/1999
|align=left| Worley, Idaho, U.S.
|align=left|
|-
|Win
|
|align=left| Louis Monaco
|UD
|6
|06/05/1999
|align=left| Tacoma, Washington, U.S.
|align=left|
|-
|Win
|
|align=left| Terry Verners
|TKO
|1
|02/11/1998
|align=left| Phoenix, Arizona, U.S.
|align=left|
|-
|Win
|
|align=left| Tui Toia
|KO
|1
|12/05/1998
|align=left| Kansas City, Missouri, U.S.
|align=left|
|-
|Win
|
|align=left| Derrick Ryals
|DQ
|3
|09/04/1998
|align=left| Phoenix, Arizona, U.S.
|align=left|
|-
|Win
|
|align=left| Felton Hamilton
|SD
|6
|19/12/1997
|align=left| New York City, U.S.
|align=left|
|-
|Win
|
|align=left| Thomas Allen
|KO
|3
|14/11/1997
|align=left| Phoenix, Arizona, U.S.
|align=left|
|-
|Win
|
|align=left| Anthony Curry
|UD
|4
|28/05/1997
|align=left| Las Vegas, Nevada, U.S.
|align=left|
|-
|Win
|
|align=left| Roberto Ramirez
|TKO
|2
|29/04/1997
|align=left| Tempe, Arizona, U.S.
|align=left|
|-
|Win
|
|align=left| Willie Chapman
|UD
|4
|11/01/1997
|align=left| Las Vegas, Nevada, U.S.
|align=left|
|-
|Win
|
|align=left| Kirk Holyfield
|TKO
|1
|30/11/1996
|align=left| Las Vegas, Nevada, U.S.
|align=left|
|}

Other
Perhaps Shufford's most notable accomplishment has been outside of the ring, playing the role of George Foreman in the 2001 film Ali.

References

External links
 

1973 births
Living people
Boxers from Virginia
American male boxers
Heavyweight boxers